Lahore is the second most populous city in Pakistan after Karachi and 26th most populous city in the world, with a population of over 13 million. It is the capital of the province of Punjab where it is the largest city. Lahore is one of Pakistan's major industrial and economic hubs, with an estimated GDP (PPP) of $84 billion as of 2019. It is the largest city as well as the historic capital and cultural centre of the wider Punjab region, and is one of Pakistan's most socially liberal, progressive, and cosmopolitan cities. It is situated in the northeast of the country, close to the international border with India. 

Lahore's origins reach into antiquity. The city has been inhabited for at least two millennia, although it rose to prominence in the 10th century. Lahore was the capital of multiple empires throughout its history, including the Hindu Shahis, Ghaznavids, and Delhi Sultanate in the medieval era. Lahore reached the height of its splendor under the Mughal Empire between the late 16th and early 18th century and served as its capital city for many years. During this period, it was one of the largest cities in the medieval world.  The city was captured by the forces of the Afsharid ruler Nader Shah in 1739. Although the Mughal authority was re-established, it fell into a period of decay while being contested among the Afghans and the Sikhs between 1748 and 1798. Lahore eventually became the capital of the Sikh Empire in the early 19th century, regaining some of its lost grandeur. Lahore was annexed to the British Raj in 1849 and became the capital of British Punjab. Lahore was central to the independence movements of both India and Pakistan, with the city being the site of both the declaration of Indian Independence and the resolution calling for the establishment of Pakistan. It experienced some of the worst riotings during the Partition period preceding Pakistan's independence. Following the success of the Pakistan Movement and the subsequent partition of British India in 1947, Lahore was declared the capital of Pakistan's Punjab province.

Lahore exerts a strong cultural influence over Pakistan. A UNESCO City of Literature and major center for Pakistan's publishing industry, Lahore remains the foremost center of Pakistan's literary scene. The city is also a major centre of education in Pakistan, with some of Pakistan's leading universities based in the city. For many years, Lahore was home to Pakistan's film industry, Lollywood, though in recent years most filming has shifted to Karachi. Lahore is a major centre of Qawwali music. The city also hosts much of Pakistan's tourist industry, with major attractions including the Walled City, the famous Badshahi and Wazir Khan mosques, as well as several Sikh and Sufi shrines. Lahore is also home to the Lahore Fort and Shalimar Gardens, both of which are UNESCO World Heritage Sites.

Etymology 

The origin of Lahore's name is unclear. The city's name has been variously recorded by early Muslim historians as Luhawar, Lūhār, and Rahwar. The Iranian polymath and geographer, Abu Rayhan Al-Biruni, referred to the city as Luhāwar in his 11th century work, Qanun, while the poet Amir Khusrow, who lived during the Delhi Sultanate period, recorded the city's name as Lāhanūr. Yaqut al-Hamawi records the city's name as Lawhūr, mentioning that it was famously known as Lahāwar. Persian historian Firishta mentions the city as Alahwar in his work, with al-Ahwar being another variation.

One theory suggests that Lahore's name is a corruption of the word Ravāwar, as R to L shifts are common in languages derived from Sanskrit. Ravāwar is the simplified pronunciation of the name Iravatyāwar, a name possibly derived from the Ravi River, known as the Iravati River in the Vedas. Another theory suggests the city's name may derive from the word Lohar, meaning "blacksmith".

According to oral tradition, Lahore was originally named after one of Lord Rama's sons  Lahore's name derives from Lavpur or Lavapuri ("City of Lav"), and is said to have been founded by Prince Lav, the son of Sita and Rama. The same account attributes the founding of nearby Kasur to his twin brother Kusha.

History

Origins 

No definitive records of Lahore's early history exist, and Lahore's ambiguous historical background has given rise to various theories about its establishment and history. Hindu legend states that Keneksen, the founder of the Solar Dynasty, migrated out from the city. Early records of Lahore are scant, but Alexander the Great's historians make no mention of any city near Lahore's location during his invasion in 326 BCE, suggesting the city had not been founded by that point or was unnoteworthy.

Ptolemy mentions in his Geography a city called Labokla situated near the Chenab and Ravi Rivers which may have been in reference to ancient Lahore, or an abandoned predecessor of the city. Chinese pilgrim Xuanzang gave a vivid description of a large and prosperous unnamed city that may have been Lahore when he visited the region in 630 CE during his tour of India. Xuanzang described the city, then under Taank rule, as a great Brahmin city.

The first document that mentions Lahore by name is the Hudud al-'Alam ("The Regions of the World"), written in 982 CE, in which Lahore is mentioned as a town which had "impressive temples, large markets and huge orchards".

Lahore, previously a town, first emerged as a notable city in 11th century during the era of Sufi saint Ali al-Hajvery. Few other references to Lahore remain from before its capture by the Ghaznavid Sultan Mahmud of Ghazni in the 11th century. During this time, Lahore appears to have served as the capital of northeast Punjab under Anandapala of the Kabul Shahi empire, who moved the capital there from Waihind. The capital would later be moved to Sialkot following Ghaznavid incursions.

Medieval era

Ghaznavid 

Sultan Mahmud of Ghazni captured Lahore somewhere in 1020–1027. Under Ghaznavid rule, Lahore emerged effectively as the empire's second capital. In 1021, Sultan Mahmud appointed Malik Ayaz to the Throne of Lahore—a governorship of the Ghaznavid Empire. The city was captured by Nialtigin, the rebellious Muslim Governor of Multan, in 1034, although his forces were expelled by Malik Ayaz in 1036.

With the support of Sultan Ibrahim Ghaznavi, Malik Ayaz rebuilt and repopulated the city, which had been devastated after the Ghaznavid invasion. Ayaz erected city walls and a masonry fort built in 1037–1040 on the ruins of the previous one, which had been demolished during the Ghaznavid invasion. A confederation of Hindu princes then unsuccessfully laid siege to Lahore in 1043–44 during Ayaz' rule. The city became a cultural and academic centre, renowned for poetry under Ayaz' reign.

Lahore was formally made the eastern capital of the Ghaznavid empire in 1152, under the reign of Khusrau Shah. The city then became the sole capital of the Ghaznavid empire in 1163 after the fall of Ghazni. Under their patronage, poets and scholars from Kashgar, Bukhara, Samarkand, Baghdad, Nishapur, Amol and Ghazni congregated in Lahore. The entire city of Lahore during the medieval Ghaznavid era was probably located west of the modern Shah Alami Bazaar and north of the Bhatti Gate.

Mamluk 
Following the Siege of Lahore in 1186, the Ghurid ruler Muhammad of Ghor captured the city and imprisoned the last Ghaznavid ruler Khusrau Malik, thus ending Ghaznavid rule over Lahore. Lahore was made an important establishment of the Mamluk dynasty of the Delhi Sultanate following the assassination of Muhammad of Ghor in 1206. Under the reign of Mamluk sultan Qutb ud-Din Aibak, Lahore attracted poets and scholars from Turkestan, Greater Khorasan, Persia, and Mesopotamia. Lahore at this time had more poets writing in Persian than any city in Persia or Khorasan.

Following the death of Aibak, Lahore was disputed among Ghurid officers. The city first came under the control of the Governor of Multan, Nasir ad-Din Qabacha, before being briefly captured by the sultan of the Mamluks in Delhi, Iltutmish, in 1217.

In an alliance with local Khokhars in 1223, Jalal al-Din Mangburni of the Khwarazmian dynasty of modern-day Uzbekistan captured Lahore after fleeing Genghis Khan's invasion of Khwarazm. Jalal ad-Din then fled from Lahore to capture the city of Uch Sharif after Iltutmish's armies re-captured Lahore in 1228.

The threat of Mongol invasions and political instability in Lahore caused future sultans to regard Delhi as a safer capital for medieval Islamic India, even though Delhi was considered a forward base whereas Lahore was widely considered the centre of Islamic culture in northeastern Punjab.

Lahore came under progressively weaker central rule under Iltutmish's descendants in Delhi, to the point that governors in the city acted with great autonomy. Under the rule of Kabir Khan Ayaz, Lahore was virtually independent from the Delhi Sultanate. Lahore was sacked and ruined by the Mongol army in 1241. Lahore governor Malik Ikhtyaruddin Qaraqash fled the Mongols, while the Mongols held the city for a few years under the rule of the Mongol chief Toghrul.

In 1266, Sultan Balban reconquered Lahore, but in 1287 under the Mongol ruler Temür Khan, the Mongols again overran northern Punjab. Because of Mongol invasions, the Lahore region had become a city on a frontier, with the region's administrative centre shifted south to Dipalpur. The Mongols again invaded northern Punjab in 1298, though their advance was eventually stopped by Ulugh Khan, brother of Sultan Alauddin Khalji of Delhi. The Mongols again attacked Lahore in 1305.

Tughluq
Lahore briefly flourished again under the reign of Ghiyath al-Din Tughlaq (Ghazi Malik) of the Tughluq dynasty between 1320 and 1325, though the city was again sacked in 1329 by Tarmashirin of the Central Asian Chagatai Khanate, and then again by the Mongol chief Hülechü. Khokhars seized Lahore in 1342, but the city was retaken by Ghazi Malik's son, Muhammad bin Tughluq. The weakened city then fell into obscurity and was captured once more by the Khokhars in 1394. By the time the Mongol conqueror Timur captured the city in 1398 from Shayka Khokhar, he did not loot it because it was no longer wealthy.

Late Sultanates

Timur gave control of the Lahore region to Khizr Khan, Governor of Multan, who later established the Sayyid dynasty in 1414 – the fourth dynasty of the Delhi Sultanate. Lahore was briefly occupied by the Timurid Governor of Kabul in 1432–33. Lahore began to be incurred upon yet again the Khokhar tribe, and so the city was granted to Bahlul Lodi in 1441 by the Sayyid dynasty in Delhi, though Lodi would then displace the Sayyids in 1451 by establishing himself upon the throne of Delhi.

Bahlul Lodi installed his cousin, Tatar Khan, to be governor of the city, though Tatar Khan died in battle with Sikandar Lodi in 1485. Governorship of Lahore was transferred by Sikandar Lodi to Umar Khan Sarwani, who quickly left the management of this city to his son Said Khan Sarwani. Said Khan was removed from power in 1500 by Sikandar Lodi, and Lahore came under the governorship of Daulat Khan Lodi, son of Tatar Khan and former employer of Guru Nanak (the founder of Sikhism).

Mughals

Early Mughal
Babur, the founder of the Mughal Empire, captured and sacked Lahore and Dipalpur, although he retreated after the Lodi nobles backed away from assisting him. The city became a refuge to Humayun and his cousin Kamran Mirza when Sher Shah Suri rose in power on the Gangetic Plains, displacing Mughal power. Sher Shah Suri continued to rise in power, and seized Lahore in 1540, though Humayun reconquered Lahore in February 1555. The establishment of Mughal rule eventually led to the most prosperous era of Lahore's history. Lahore's prosperity and central position has yielded more Mughal-era monuments in Lahore than either Delhi or Agra.

By the time of the rule of the Mughal empire's greatest emperors, a majority of Lahore's residents did not live within the walled city itself but instead lived in suburbs that had spread outside the city's walls. Only 9 of the 36 urban quarters around Lahore, known as guzars, were located within the city walls during the Akbar period. During this period, Lahore was closely tied to smaller market towns known as qasbahs, such as Kasur and Eminabad, as well as Amritsar, and Batala in modern-day India, which in turn, linked to supply chains in villages surrounding each qasbah.

Akbar
Beginning in 1584, Lahore became the Mughal capital when Akbar began re-fortifying the city's ruined citadel, laying the foundations for the revival of the Lahore Fort. Akbar made Lahore one of his original twelve subah provinces, and in 1585–86, relegated governorship of the city and subah to Bhagwant Das, brother of Mariam-uz-Zamani, who was commonly known as "Jodhabhai".

Akbar also rebuilt the city's walls and extended their perimeter east of the Shah Alami bazaar to encompass the sparsely populated area of Rarra Maidan. The Akbari Mandi grain market was set up during this era, which continues to function to the present-day. Akbar also established the Dharampura neighbourhood in the early 1580s, which survives today. The earliest of Lahore's many havelis date from the Akbari era.

Lahore's Mughal monuments were built under the reign of Akbar and several subsequent emperors. Lahore reached its cultural zenith during this period, with dozens of mosques, tombs, shrines, and urban infrastructure developed in the city.

Jahangir
During the reign of Emperor Jahangir in the early 17th century, Lahore's bazaars were noted to be vibrant, frequented by foreigners, and stocked with a wide array of goods. In 1606, Jehangir's rebel son Khusrau Mirza laid siege to Lahore after obtaining the blessings of the Sikh Guru Arjan Dev. Jehangir quickly defeated his son at Bhairowal, and the roots of Mughal–Sikh animosity grew. Sikh Guru Arjan Dev was executed in Lahore in 1606 for his involvement in the rebellion. Emperor Jahangir chose to be buried in Lahore, and his tomb was built in Lahore's Shahdara Bagh suburb in 1637 by his wife Nur Jahan, whose tomb is also nearby.

Shah Jahan
Jahangir's son, Shah Jahan (reigned 1628–1658), was born in Lahore in 1592. He renovated large portions of the Lahore Fort with luxurious white marble and erected the iconic Naulakha Pavilion in 1633. Shah Jahan lavished Lahore with some of its most celebrated and iconic monuments, such as the Shahi Hammam in 1635, and both the Shalimar Gardens and the extravagantly decorated Wazir Khan Mosque in 1641. The population of pre-modern Lahore probably reached its zenith during his reign, with suburban districts home to perhaps 6 times as many compared to within the Walled City.

Aurangzeb

Shah Jahan's son, Aurangzeb, last of the great Mughal Emperors, further contributed to the development of Lahore. Aurangzeb built the Alamgiri Bund embankment along the Ravi River in 1662 in order to prevent its shifting course from threatening the city's walls. The area near the embankment grew into a fashionable locality, with several nearby pleasure gardens laid by Lahore's gentry. The largest of Lahore's Mughal monuments, the Badshahi Mosque, was raised during Aurangzeb's reign in 1673, as well as the iconic Alamgiri Gate of the Lahore Fort in 1674.

Late Mughal

Civil wars regarding succession to the Mughal throne following Aurangzeb's death in 1707 led to weakening control over Lahore from Delhi, and a prolonged period of decline in Lahore. Mughal preoccupation with the Marathas in the Deccan Plateau eventually resulted in Lahore being governed by a series of governors who pledged nominal allegiance to the ever-weaker Mughal emperors in Delhi.

Mughal Emperor Bahadur Shah I died en route to Lahore as part of a campaign in 1711 to subdue Sikh rebels under the leadership of Banda Singh Bahadur. His sons fought a battle outside Lahore in 1712 for succession to the Mughal crown, with Jahandar winning the throne. Sikh rebels were defeated during the reign of Farrukhsiyar when Abd as-Samad and Zakariyya Khan suppressed them.

Nader Shah's brief invasion of the Mughal Empire in early 1739 wrested control away from Zakariya Khan Bahadur. Though Khan was able to win back control after the Persian armies had left, Nader Shah's invasion shifted trade routes away from Lahore, and south towards Kandahar instead. Indus ports near the Arabian Sea that served Lahore also silted up during this time, reducing the city's importance even further.

Struggles between Zakariyya Khan's sons following his death in 1745 further weakened Muslim control over Lahore, thus leaving the city in a power vacuum, and vulnerable to foreign marauders.

Durrani invasions 
Ahmad Shah Durrani, the founder of the Afghan Durrani Empire, captured Lahore in January 1748. Following Ahmed Shah Durrani's quick retreat, the Mughals entrusted Lahore to Mu’īn al-Mulk Mir Mannu. Ahmad Shah Durrani again invaded in 1751, forcing Mir Mannu into signing a treaty that submitted Lahore to Afghan rule. The Mughal Wazīr Ghazi Din Imad al-Mulk would seize Lahore in 1756, provoking Ahmad Shah Durrani to again invade in 1757, after which he placed the city under the rule of his son, Timur Shah Durrani.

Durrani rule was interrupted when Lahore was briefly captured by the Marathas in 1758 during their campaigns against the Afghans, under Raghunathrao, who drove out the Afghans. The following year, a combined Sikh–Maratha force defeated an Afghan assault in the 1759 Battle of Lahore. Following the Third Battle of Panipat, Ahmad Shah Durrani defeated the Marathas and recaptured Lahore. After the Durranis withdrew from the city in 1765, Sikh forces quickly occupied the city. The Durranis invaded two more times—in 1797 and 1798—under Shah Zaman, but the Sikhs re-occupied the city after both invasions.

Sikh

Early
Expanding Sikh Misls secured control over Lahore in 1767, when the Bhangi Misl state captured the city. In 1780, the city was divided among three rulers: Gujjar Singh, Lahna Singh, and Sobha Singh. Instability resulting from this arrangement allowed nearby Amritsar to establish itself as the area's primary commercial centre in place of Lahore.

Ahmad Shah Durrani's grandson, Zaman Shah, invaded Lahore in 1796, and again in 1798–99. Ranjit Singh negotiated with the Afghans for the post of subahdar to control Lahore following the second invasion.

By the end of the 18th century, the city's population drastically declined, with its remaining residents living within the city walls, while the extramural suburbs lay abandoned, forcing travellers to pass through abandoned and ruined suburbs for a few miles before reaching the city's gates.

Sikh Empire

In the aftermath of Zaman Shah’s 1799 invasion of Punjab, Ranjit Singh, of nearby Gujranwala, began to consolidate his position. Singh was able to seize control of the region after a series of battles with the Sikh Bhangi Misl chiefs who had seized Lahore in 1780. His army marched to Anarkali, where according to legend, the gatekeeper of the Lohari Gate, Mukham Din Chaudhry, opened the gates allowing Ranjit Singh's army to enter Lahore. After capturing Lahore, Sikh soldiers immediately began plundering Muslim areas of the city until their actions were reined in by Ranjit Singh.

Ranjit Singh's rule restored some of Lahore's lost grandeur, but at the expense of destroying the remaining Mughal architecture for building materials. He established a mint in the city in 1800, and moved into the Mughal palace at the Lahore Fort after repurposing it for his own use in governing the Sikh Empire. In 1801, he established the Gurdwara Janam Asthan Guru Ram Das to mark the site where Guru Ram Das was born in 1534.

Lahore became the empire's administrative capital, though the nearby economic centre of Amritsar had also been established as the empire's spiritual capital by 1802. By 1812, Singh had mostly refurbished the city's defences by adding a second circuit of outer walls surrounding Akbar's original walls, with the two separated by a moat. Singh also partially restored Shah Jahan's decaying Shalimar Gardens 
and built the Hazuri Bagh Baradari in 1818 to celebrate his capture of the Koh-i-Noor diamond from Shuja Shah Durrani in 1813. He erected the Gurdwara Dera Sahib to mark the site of Guru Arjan Dev's death (1606). The Sikh royal court also endowed religious architecture in the city, including a number of Sikh gurdwaras, Hindu temples, and havelis.

While much of Lahore's Mughal era fabric lay in ruins by the time of his arrival, Ranjit Singh's rule saw the re-establishment of Lahore's glory – though Mughal monuments suffered during the Sikh period. Singh's armies plundered most of Lahore's most precious Mughal monuments, and stripped the white marble from several monuments to send to different parts of the Sikh Empire during his reign. Monuments plundered for decorative materials include the Tomb of Asif Khan, the Tomb of Nur Jahan, and the Shalimar Gardens. Ranjit Singh's army also desecrated the Badshahi Mosque by converting it into an ammunition depot and a stable for horses. The Sunehri Mosque in the Walled City of Lahore was also converted to a gurdwara, while the Mosque of Mariyam Zamani Begum was repurposed into a gunpowder factory.

Late 
The Sikh royal court (Lahore Durbar) underwent a quick succession of rulers after the death of Ranjit Singh. His son Kharak Singh died on 6 November 1840, soon after taking the throne. On that same day, the next appointed successor to the throne, Nau Nihal Singh, died in an accident at the gardens of Hazuri Bagh. Maharaja Sher Singh was then selected as Maharajah, though his claim to the throne was quickly challenged by Chand Kaur, widow of Kharak Singh and mother of Nau Nihal Singh, who quickly seized the throne. Sher Singh raised an army that attacked Chand Kaur's forces in Lahore on 14 January 1841. His soldiers mounted weaponry on the minarets of the Badshahi Mosque in order to target Chand Kaur's forces in the Lahore Fort, destroying the fort's historic Diwan-e-Aam. Kaur quickly ceded the throne, but Sher Sing was then assassinated in 1843 in Lahore's Chah Miran neighbourhood along with his wazir Dhiyan Singh. Dhyan Singh's son, Hira Singh, sought to avenge his father's death by laying siege to Lahore in order to capture his father's assassins. The siege resulted in the capture of his father's murderer, Ajit Singh. Duleep Singh was then crowned Maharajah, with Hira Singh as his wazir, but his power would be weakened by the continued infighting among Sikh nobles, as well as confrontations against the British during the two Anglo-Sikh wars.

After the conclusion of the two Anglo-Sikh wars, the Sikh Empire fell into disarray, resulting in the fall of the Lahore Durbar, and commencement of British rule after they captured Lahore and the wider Punjab region.

British colonial period 

The British East India Company seized control of Lahore in February 1846 from the collapsing Sikh state and occupied the rest of Punjab in 1848. Following the defeat of the Sikhs at the Battle of Gujrat, British troops formally deposed Maharaja Duleep Singh in Lahore that same year. Punjab was then annexed to the British Indian Empire in 1849.

At the commencement of British rule, Lahore was estimated to have a population of 120,000. Prior to annexation by the British, Lahore's environs consisted mostly of the Walled City surrounded by plains interrupted by settlements to the south and east, such as Mozang and Qila Gujar Singh, which have since been engulfed by modern Lahore. The plains between the settlements also contained the remains of Mughal gardens, tombs, and Sikh-era military structures.

The British viewed Lahore's Walled City as a bed of potential social discontent and disease epidemics, and so largely left the inner city alone, while focusing development efforts in Lahore's suburban areas and Punjab's fertile countryside. The British instead laid out their capital city in an area south of the Walled City that would first come to be known as "Donald's Town" before being renamed "Civil Station".

Under early British rule, formerly prominent Mughal-era monuments that were scattered throughout Civil Station were also re-purposed and sometimes desecrated – including the Tomb of Anarkali, which the British had initially converted to clerical offices before re-purposing it as an Anglican church in 1851. The 17th-century Dai Anga Mosque was converted into railway administration offices during this time, the tomb of Nawab Bahadur Khan was converted into a storehouse, and the tomb of Mir Mannu was used as a wine shop. The British also used older structures to house municipal offices, such as the Civil Secretariat, Public Works Department, and Accountant General's Office.

The British built the Lahore Railway Station just outside the Walled City shortly after the Sepoy Mutiny of 1857; the station was therefore styled as a medieval castle to ward off any potential future uprisings, with thick walls, turrets, and holes to direct gun and cannon fire for the defence of the structure. Lahore's most prominent government institutions and commercial enterprises came to be concentrated in Civil Station in a half-mile wide area flanking The Mall, where unlike in Lahore's military zone, the British and locals were allowed to mix. The Mall continues to serve as the epicentre of Lahore's civil administration, as well as one of its most fashionable commercial areas. The British also laid the spacious Lahore Cantonment to the southeast of the Walled City at the former village of Mian Mir, where unlike around The Mall, laws did exist against the mixing of different races.

Lahore was visited on 9 February 1870 by Prince Alfred, Duke of Edinburgh – a visit in which he received delegations from the Dogras of Jammu, Maharajas of Patiala, the Nawab of Bahawalpur, and other rulers from various Punjabi states. During the visit, he visited several of Lahore's major sights. British authorities built several important structures around the time of the Golden Jubilee of Queen Victoria (1887) in the distinctive Indo-Saracenic style, including the Lahore Museum and Mayo School of Industrial Arts.

The British carried out a census of Lahore in 1901, and counted 20,691 houses in the Walled City. An estimated 200,000 people lived in Lahore at this time. Lahore's posh Model Town was established as a "garden town" suburb in 1921, while Krishan Nagar locality was laid in the 1930s near The Mall and Walled City.

Lahore played an important role in the independence movements of both India and Pakistan. The Declaration of the Independence of India was moved by Jawaharlal Nehru and passed unanimously at midnight on 31 December 1929 at Lahore's Bradlaugh Hall. The Indian Swaraj flag was adopted this time as well. Lahore's jail was used by the British to imprison independence activists such as Jatin Das, and was also where Bhagat Singh was hanged in 1931. Under the leadership of Muhammad Ali Jinnah, the All India Muslim League passed the Lahore Resolution in 1940, demanding the creation of Pakistan as a separate homeland for the Muslims of India.

Partition 
The 1941 census showed that city of Lahore had a population of 671,659, of which was 64.5% Muslim, with the remainder 35% being Hindu and Sikh, alongside a small Christian community. The population figure was disputed by Hindus and Sikhs before the Boundary Commission that would draw the Radcliffe Line to demarcate the border of the two new states based on religious demography. In a bid to have Lahore awarded to India, they argued that the city was only 54% Muslim, and that Hindu and Sikh domination of the city's economy and educational institutions should trump Muslim demography. Two-thirds of shops, and 80% of Lahore's factories belonged to the Hindu and Sikh community. Kuldip Nayyar claimed that Cyril Radcliffe had told him in 1971 that he originally had planned to give Lahore to the new Dominion of India, but decided to place it within the Dominion of Pakistan, which he saw as lacking a major city as he had already awarded Calcutta to India.

As tensions grew over the city's uncertain fate, Lahore experienced Partition's worst riots. Carnage ensued in which all three religious groups were both victims and perpetrators. Early riots in March and April 1947 destroyed 6,000 of Lahore's 82,000 homes. Violence continued to rise throughout the summer, despite the presence of armoured British personnel. Hindus and Sikhs began to leave the city en masse as their hopes that the Boundary Commission to award the city to India came to be regarded as increasingly unlikely. By late August 1947, 66% of Hindus and Sikhs had left the city. The Shah Alami Bazaar, once a largely Hindu quarter of the Walled City, was entirely burnt down during subsequent rioting.

When Pakistan's independence was declared on 14 August 1947, the Radcliffe Line had not yet been announced, and so cries of "Long live Pakistan" and "God is greatest" were heard intermittently with "Long live Hindustan" throughout the night. On 17 August 1947, Lahore was awarded to Pakistan on the basis of its Muslim majority in the 1941 census and was made capital of the Punjab province in the new state of Pakistan. The city's location near the Indian border meant that it received large numbers of refugees fleeing eastern Punjab and northern India, though it was able to accommodate them given the large stock of abandoned Hindu and Sikh properties that could be re-distributed to newly arrived refugees.

Modern 

 
Partition left Lahore with a much-weakened economy, and a stymied social and cultural scene that had previously been invigorated by the city's Hindus and Sikhs. Industrial production dropped to one-third of pre-Partition levels by the end of the 1940s, and only 27% of its manufacturing units were operating by 1950, and usually well-below capacity. Capital flight further weakened the city's economy while Karachi industrialized and became more prosperous. 

The city's weakened economy, and proximity to the Indian border, meant that the city was deemed unsuitable to be the Pakistani capital after independence. Karachi was therefore chosen to be capital on account of its relative tranquillity during the Partition period, stronger economy, and better infrastructure.

After independence, Lahore slowly regained its significance as an economic and cultural centre of western Punjab. Reconstruction began in 1949 of the Shah Alami Bazaar, the former commercial heart of the Walled City until it was destroyed in the 1947 riots. The Tomb of Allama Iqbal was built in 1951 to honour the philosopher-poet who provided the spiritual inspiration for the Pakistan movement. In 1955, Lahore was selected to be the capital of all West Pakistan during the single-unit period that lasted until 1970. Shortly afterwards, Lahore's iconic Minar-e-Pakistan was completed in 1968 to mark the spot where the Pakistan Resolution was passed. With support from the United Nations, the government was able to rebuild Lahore, and most scars from the communal violence of Partition were ameliorated.

The second Islamic Summit Conference was held in the city in 1974. In retaliation for the destruction of the Babri Masjid in India, riots erupted in 1992 in which several non-Muslim monuments were targeted, including the tomb of Maharaja Sher Singh, and the former Jain temple near The Mall. In 1996, the International Cricket Council Cricket World Cup final match was held at the Gaddafi Stadium in Lahore.

The Walled City of Lahore restoration project began in 2009, when the Punjab government restored the Royal Trail from Akbari Gate to the Lahore Fort with money from the World Bank.

Geography 

Lahore is in northeastern portion of Pakistan, lying between 31°15′—31°45′ N and 74°01′—74°39′ E. The city is bounded on the north and west by the Sheikhupura District, on the east by Wagah, and on the south by Kasur District. The Ravi River flows on the northern side of Lahore.

Climate 

Lahore has a semi-arid climate (Köppen climate classification BSh), not receiving enough rainfall to feature the humid subtropical climate. The hottest month is June, where temperatures routinely exceed . The monsoon season starts in late July, and the wettest months are July and August, with heavy rainfalls and evening thunderstorms with the possibility of cloudbursts and flash floods. The coolest month is January, with dense fog.

Demographics

Population 
The results of the 2017 Census determined the population of Lahore to be 11,126,285, with an annual growth rate of 4.07% since 1998. Gender-wise, 52.35% of the population are male, 47.64% are female, and 0.01% are transgender. Lahore is a demographically young city, with over 40% of its inhabitants below the age of 15.

Ethnic groups 

According to the official census statistics, 80.9% of Lahore’s population are Punjabis, 12.6% Urdu-speaking people, 2.7% Pashtuns, 1.02% Saraikis, and 2.78% are of other ethnicities.

Religion 

According to the 2017 Census, the vast majority of Lahore's population are Muslims (94.7%), roughly the same as in the 1998 Census, and up from 60% in 1941. Other religions include Christians (5.14%, slightly less than 5.80% in 1998; though according to the 1998 Census, they formed around 9.0% of the rural population) and small numbers of Ahmadis, Baháʼís, Hindus, Parsis, and Sikhs. There is also a small but longstanding Zoroastrian community. 

Since Lahore contains some of Sikhism's holiest sites, it is a major pilgrimage destination for Sikhs. Lahore's first church was built during the reign of Emperor Akbar in the late 16th century, but was then leveled by Shah Jahan in 1632. Due to the few numbers of Hindus living in Lahore, the only two functional Hindu temples in the city are the Shri Krishna Mandir and the Valmiki Mandir.

Languages
The Punjabi language is the most-widely spoken native language in Lahore, with 80% of Lahore counting it as their first language according to the 2017 Census. Lahore is the largest Punjabi-speaking city in the world.

Urdu and English are used as official languages and as mediums of instruction and media administration. However, Punjabi is also taught at graduation level and used in theaters, films, and newspapers from Lahore. Several Lahore-based prominent educational leaders, researchers, and social commentators have demanded that the Punjabi language should be declared as the medium of instruction at the primary level and be used officially in the Punjab Assembly, Lahore.

Cityscape

Old City 

Lahore's modern cityscape consists of the historic Walled City of Lahore in the northern part of the city, which contains several World Heritage Sites and national heritage sites. Lahore's urban planning was not based on geometric design but was instead built piecemeal, with small cul-de-sacs, as katrahs and galis developed in the context of neighbouring buildings. Though certain neighbourhoods were named for particular religious or ethnic communities, the neighbourhoods themselves typically were diverse and were not dominated by the namesake group.

Lahore's urban typology is similar to other ancient cities in South Asia, such as Peshawar, Multan and Delhi – all of which were founded near a major river, and included an old walled city and royal citadel.

By the end of the Sikh rule, most of Lahore's massive haveli compounds had been occupied by settlers. New neighbourhoods occasionally grew up entirely within the confines of an old Mughal haveli, such as the Mohallah Pathan Wali, which grew within the ruins of a haveli of the same name, built by Mian Khan. By 1831, all Mughal Havelis in the Walled City had been encroached upon by the surrounding neighbourhood, leading to the modern-day absence of any Mughal Havelis in Lahore.

A total of thirteen gates once surrounded the historic walled city. Some of the remaining gates include the Raushnai Gate, Masti Gate, Yakki Gate, Kashmiri Gate, Khizri Gate, Shah Burj Gate, Akbari Gate, and Lahori Gate. Southeast of the walled city is the spacious British-era Lahore Cantonment.

Architecture 

Lahore is home to numerous monuments from the Mughal Dynasty, Sikh Empire, and the British Indian Raj. The architectural style of the Walled City of Lahore has traditionally been influenced by Mughal and Sikh styles.

Sikh period
By the arrival of the Sikh Empire at the end of the 18th century, Lahore had decayed from its former glory as the Mughal capital. Rebuilding efforts under Ranjit Singh and his successors were influenced by Mughal practices, and Lahore was known as the 'City of Gardens' during the Ranjit Singh period. Later, British maps of the area surrounding Lahore dating from the mid-19th century show many walled private gardens which were confiscated from the Muslim noble families bearing the names of prominent Sikh nobles – a pattern of patronage which was inherited from the Mughals.

While much of Lahore's Mughal-era fabric lay in ruins by the time of his arrival, Ranjit Singh's army's plundered most of Lahore's most precious Mughal monuments, and stripped the white marble from several monuments to send to different parts of the Sikh Empire. Monuments plundered of their marble include the Tomb of Asif Khan and the Tomb of Nur Jahan; the Shalimar Gardens was plundered of much of its marble, and its costly agate gate was stripped. The Sikh state also demolished a number of shrines and monuments laying outside the city's walls.

Still, Sikh rule left Lahore with several monuments, and a heavily altered Lahore Fort. Ranjit Singh's rule restored some of Lahore's previous grandeur, and the city was left with a large number of religious monuments from this period. Several havelis were built during this era, though only a few still remain.

British period

As the capital of British Punjab, British colonialists made a lasting architectural impression on the city. Structures were built predominantly in the Indo-Gothic style – a syncretic architectural style that blends elements of Victorian and Islamic architecture o r in the distinct Indo-Saracenic style. The British also built neoclassical Montgomery Hall, which today serves as the Quaid-e-Azam Library.

Lawrence Gardens were also laid near Civil Station, and were paid for by donations solicited from both Lahore's European community, as well as from wealthy locals. The gardens featured over 600 species of plants, and were tended to by a horticulturist sent from London's Royal Botanic Gardens at Kew.

The leafy suburbs to the south of the Old City, as well as the Cantonment southwest of the Old City, were largely developed under British colonial rule, and feature colonial-era buildings built alongside leafy avenues.

The British authorities built several important structures around the time of the Golden Jubilee of Queen Victoria in 1887 in the distinctive Indo-Saracenic style, such as the Lahore Museum and Mayo School of Industrial Arts. Other prominent examples of the Indo-Saracenic style in Lahore include Lahore's prestigious Aitchison College, the Punjab Chief Court (today the Lahore High Court), Lahore Museum, and the University of the Punjab.

Many of Lahore's most important buildings were designed by civil engineer and architect Sir Ganga Ram, who is considered "the father of modern Lahore".

Parks and gardens 

Lahore is also known as "the city of gardens" due to its large number of gardens. The Shahdara Bagh was one of the earliest Mughal gardens, laid out in 15th century, and contains the Tomb of Jahangir. The Shalimar Gardens were laid out during the reign of Shah Jahan and were designed to mimic the Islamic paradise of the afterlife described in the Qur'an. The gardens follow the familiar charbagh layout of four squares, with three descending terraces. In 1818, Hazuri Bagh was built during reign of Ranjit Singh to celebrate his capture of the Koh-i-Noor diamond from Shuja Shah Durrani.

The Lawrence Garden was established in 1862 and was originally named after Sir John Lawrence, late 19th-century British Viceroy to India. The Circular Garden, which surrounds the Walled City on three sides, was established by 1892. The former parade ground adjacent to Badshahi Mosque was also renamed during the British era as Minto Park, which after restoration was re-established as Iqbal Park.

The many other gardens and parks in the city include Hazuri Bagh, Iqbal Park, Mochi Bagh, Gulshan-e-Iqbal Park, Model Town Park, Jilani Park, Nasir Bagh Lahore, Jallo Park, Lahore Zoo Safari Park, and Changa Manga, a man-made forest near Lahore in the Kasur district. Another example is the Bagh-e-Jinnah, a  botanical garden that houses entertainment and sports facilities as well as a library.

Economy 

, the city's gross domestic product (GDP) by purchasing power parity (PPP) was estimated at $40 billion with a projected average growth rate of 5.6 percent. This is on par with Karachi, Pakistan's economic hub, with Lahore (having half the population) fostering an economy that is 51% of the size of Karachi's ($78 billion in 2008). It is estimated that Lahore contributes 11.5% to the national economy, and 19% to the provincial economy of Punjab. As a whole, Punjab has a $115 billion economy, making it the first (and to date, only) Pakistani Subdivision with an economy of more than $100 billion, at the rank 144. Lahore's GDP is projected to be $102 billion by 2025, with a slightly higher growth rate of 5.6% per annum, as compared to Karachi's 5.5%.

A major industrial agglomeration with about 9,000 industrial units, Lahore has shifted in recent decades from manufacturing to service industries. Some 42% of its work force is employed in finance, banking, real estate, community, cultural, and social services. The city is Pakistan's largest software and hardware producing centre, and hosts a growing computer-assembly industry. The city has always been a centre for publications; 80% of Pakistan's books are published in Lahore, and it remains the foremost centre of literary, educational, and cultural activity in Pakistan.

The Lahore Expo Centre is one of the biggest projects in the history of the city and was inaugurated on 22 May 2010. Defense Raya Golf Resort, also under construction, will be Pakistan's and Asia's largest golf course. The project is the result of a partnership between DHA Lahore and BRDB Malaysia. The rapid development of large projects such as these in the city is expected to boost the economy of the country. Ferozepur Road of the Central business districts of Lahore contains high-rises and skyscrapers including Kayre International Hotel and Arfa Software Technology Park.

Transport

Public transportation 

Lahore's main public transportation system is operated by the Lahore Transport Company (LTC) and Punjab Mass Transit Authority (PMTA). The backbone of its public transport network is the PMTA's Lahore Metrobus and the Orange Line of the Lahore Metro train. LTC and PMTA also operates an extensive network of buses, providing bus service to many parts of the city and acting as a feeder system for the Metrobus.

Metrobus

The Lahore Metrobus is a bus rapid transit service operating in Lahore, Punjab, Pakistan. Lahore Metrobus service is integrated with Lahore Transport Company's local bus service to operate as one urban transport system, providing a connected transit service across Lahore District with connections to neighboring suburban communities.

Low occupancy vehicles 
Low occupancy vehicle (LOVs)—functionally a medium-sized van or wagon—run on routes throughout the city. They function like buses and operate on many routes throughout the city.

Metro Train

Orange Line

The Orange Line Metro Train is an automated rapid transit system in Lahore. The Orange line is the first of the three proposed rail lines proposed for the Lahore Metro. As of 2020, it is the primary metro rail line in the city. The line spans , with  elevated and  underground, and had a cost of 251.06 billion rupees ($1.6 billion). The line consists of 26 subway stations (Ali Town Station to Dera Gujran Station) and is designed to carry over 250,000 passengers daily. CRRC Zhuzhou Locomotive rolled out the first of 27 trains for the metro on 16 May 2017. For improved durability, its bogies are heat-resistant, can manage unstable voltage, and feature energy-saving air-conditioning. Successful initial test trials were run in mid-2018, and commercial operations began on 25 October 2020.

Blue Line
The Blue Line is a proposed  line from Chauburji to College Road Township. Along the way, it will connect places like Mozang Chungi, Shadman Chowk, Jail Road, Mian Boulevard Gulberg, Mian Boulevard Garden Town, and Faisal Town.

Purple Line
The Purple Line is a proposed  line from Bhaati Chowk to the Allama Iqbal International Airport. Along the way, it will connect places like Brandreth Road, Railway Station, Allama Iqbal Road, Dharampura, and Ghazi Road.

Taxi and rickshaw 
Ride-sharing services such as Uber and Careem are available in the city. Motorcycle rides are also available in the city, which have been introduced by private companies.

Auto rickshaws play an important role of public transport in Lahore. There are 246,458 auto rickshaws, often simply called autos, in the city. Motorcycle rickshaws, usually called chand gari ('moon car') or chingchi (after the Chinese company Jinan Qingqi Motorcycle Co. Ltd, who first introduced these to the market), are also a common means of domestic travel, though they are less common and cheaper than auto rickshaws. Chingchi rickshaws provide a shared ride experience for multiple passengers and fares, whereas auto rickshaws cater to only one passenger or group for a fare. Since 2002, all auto rickshaws have been required to use compressed natural gas as fuel.

Intercity transportation

Railways 

Lahore Junction Station serves as the main railway station for Lahore, and serves as a major hub for all Pakistan Railways services in northern Pakistan. It includes services to Peshawar and the national capital metropolitan area of Islamabad–Rawalpindi, and long-distance services to Karachi and Quetta. Lahore Cantonment Station also operates a few trains.

Buses 

Lahore Badami Bagh Bus Terminal (known colloquially as "Lari Adda") serves as a hub for intercity bus services in Lahore, served by multiple bus companies providing a comprehensive network of services in Punjab and neighbouring provinces. Lahore Jinnah Bus Terminal is also a major bus stand in southern Lahore. Apart from these stations, multiple privately owned bus transportation companies operate from Band Road (referred to colloquially as "Chowk Yateem Khana"), offering intercity transport at varying fares and comfort levels.

Airports 

Pakistan's third busiest airport, Allama Iqbal International Airport (IATA: LHE), straddles the city's eastern boundary. The new passenger terminal was opened in 2003, replacing the old terminal which now serves as a VIP and Hajj lounge. The airport was named after the national poet-philosopher, Muhammad Iqbal, and is a secondary hub for the national carrier, Pakistan International Airlines. Walton Airport in Askari provides general aviation facilities. Sialkot International Airport (IATA: SKT) and Faisalabad International Airport (IATA: LYP) also serve as alternate airports for the Lahore area, in addition to serving their respective cities.

Allama Iqbal International Airport connects Lahore with many cities worldwide (including domestic destinations) by both passenger and cargo flight including Ras al Khaimah, Guangzhou (begins 28 August 2018), Ürümqi, Abu Dhabi, Barcelona, Beijing–Capital, Copenhagen, Dammam, Dera Ghazi Khan, Doha, Dubai–International, Islamabad, Jeddah, Karachi, Kuala Lumpur–International, London–Heathrow, Manchester, Medina, Milan–Malpensa, Multan, Muscat, Oslo–Gardermoen, Paris–Charles de Gaulle, Peshawar, Quetta, Rahim Yar Khan, Riyadh, Salalah, Tokyo–Narita, Toronto–Pearson, Mashhad, Bangkok–Suvarnabhumi, and Tashkent.

Roads 

There are a number of municipal, provincial and federal roads that serve Lahore.
Municipal roads
Canal Road – serves as the major north–south artery
Provincial highways
Lahore Ring Road
Lahore–Kasur Road (Ferozepur Road)
Lahore–Raiwind Road (Raiwind Road)
Lahore–Sharaqpur Road (Sagianwala Bypass Road)
Lahore–Wagah Road
Grand Trunk Road (G.T Road )
Federal highways
M-2 motorway 
M-3 motorway
M-11 motorway
N-5 National Highway (Multan Road)
N-60 National Highway (Sargodha–Lahore road)

Government

Metropolitan Corporation
Under Punjab Local Government Act 2013, Lahore is a metropolitan area under the authority of the Metropolitan Corporation Lahore. The Metropolitan Corporation Lahore is a body consisting of 9 deputy mayors (one from each zone in the district) and the city's mayor – all of whom are elected in popular elections. The Metropolitan Corporation approves zoning and land use, coordinates urban design and planning, sets environmental protection laws, and provides municipal services.

Mayor

As per the Punjab Local Government Act 2013, the Mayor of Lahore is the elected head of the Metropolitan Corporation of Lahore. The mayor is directly elected in municipal elections every four years alongside 9 deputy town mayors. Mubashir Javed of the Pakistan Muslim League (N) was elected mayor of Lahore in 2016. The mayor is responsible for the administration of government services, the composition of councils and committees overseeing Lahore City District departments and serves as the chairperson for the meeting of the Lahore Council. The mayor also functions to help devise long-term development plans in consultation with other stakeholders and bodies to improve the condition, livability, and sustainability of urban areas.

Neighbourhoods 

Lahore District is a subdivision of the Punjab, and is further divided into 9 administrative zones. Each town in turn consists of a group of union councils, of which there are 274 total.

Politics 
The 2015 local government elections for Union Councils in Lahore yielded the following results:

Festivals 

The people of Lahore celebrate many festivals and events throughout the year, including Islamic, traditional Punjabi, Christian, and national holidays and festivals.

Many people decorate their houses and light candles to illuminate the streets and houses during public holidays; roads and businesses may be lit for days. Many of Lahore's dozens of Sufi shrines hold annual festivals called urs to honour their respective saints. For example, the mausoleum of Ali Hujwiri at the Data Darbar shrine has an annual urs that attracts up to one million visitors per year. The popular Mela Chiraghan festival in Lahore takes place at the shrine of Madho Lal Hussain, while other large urs take place at the shrines of Bibi Pak Daman, and at the Shrine of Mian Mir. Eid ul-Fitr and Eid ul-Adha are celebrated in the city with public buildings and shopping centers decorated in lights. The people of Lahore also commemorate the martyrdom of Imam Husain at Karbala with massive processions that take place during the first ten days of the month of Muharram.

Basant is a traditional Punjabi festival that marks the coming of spring. Basant celebrations in Pakistan are centred in Lahore, and people from all over the country and abroad come to the city for the annual festivities. Kite-flying competitions traditionally take place on city rooftops during Basant, while the Lahore Canal is decorated with floating lanterns. Courts have banned kite-flying because of casualties and power installation losses. The ban was lifted for two days in 2007, then immediately reimposed when 11 people were killed by celebratory gunfire, sharp kite-strings, electrocution, and falls related to the competition.

Lahore's churches are elaborately decorated for Christmas and Easter celebrations. Shopping centers and public buildings also feature Christmas installations to celebrate the holiday, even though Christians only constitute 3% of the total population of Lahore in 2016.

Tourism 

Lahore remains a major tourist destination in Pakistan. The Walled City of Lahore was renovated in 2014 and is popular due to the presence of UNESCO World Heritage Sites. Among the most popular sights are the Lahore Fort, adjacent to the Walled City, and home to the Sheesh Mahal, the Alamgiri Gate, the Naulakha pavilion, and the Moti Masjid. The fort and adjoining Shalimar Gardens have been a UNESCO World Heritage Site since 1981.

The city is home to several ancient religious sites, including prominent Hindu temples: the Krishna Temple and Valmiki Mandir. The Samadhi of Ranjit Singh, also located near the Walled City, houses the funerary urns of the Sikh ruler Maharaja Ranjit Singh. The most prominent religious building is the Badshahi Mosque, constructed in 1673; it was the largest mosque in the world upon construction. Another popular sight is the Wazir Khan Mosque, constructed in 1635 and known for its extensive faience tile work.

Cuisine

Religious sites 
Well-known religious sites in the city include:

 Badshahi Mosque
 Dai Anga Mosque
 Darbar Madho Lal Hussain
 Data Darbar Complex
 Grand Jamia Mosque, Lahore
 Gurdwara Dera Sahib
 Gurdwara Janam Asthan Guru Ram Das
 Krishna Mandir, Lahore
 Lava Temple
 Lohari Gate Mosque
 Masjid of Mariyam Zamani
 Masjid Shuhada
 Moti Masjid (Lahore Fort)
 Muhammad Saleh Kamboh Mosque
 Neevin Mosque
 Oonchi Mosque
 Sacred Heart Cathedral, Lahore
 Shab Bhar Mosque
 Shaheed Ganj Mosque
 St. Andrew's Presbyterian Church
 Suneri Mosque
 Valmiki Temple
 Wazir Khan Mosque

Museums 
 Army Museum Lahore
 Fakir Khana
 Islamic Summit Minar
 Javed Manzil
 Lahore Museum
 National History Museum
 National Museum of Science and Technology
 Shakir Ali Museum
 Tollinton Market-Lahore City Heritage Museum

Tombs 

 Tomb of Ali Mardan Khan
 Tomb of Allama Iqbal
 Tomb of Anarkali
 Tomb of Asif Khan
 Tomb of Dai Anga
 Tomb of Jani Khan
 Tomb of Jahangir
 Tomb of Nadira Begum
 Tomb of Nur Jahan
 Tomb of Dai Anga
 Buddhu's Tomb
 Cypress Tomb or Sarowala Maqbara
 Tomb of Zeb-un-Nissa Begum
 Tomb of Gul Begum
 Tomb of Malik Ayaz
 Kuri Bagh
 Mai Dai
 Mian Khan
 Nusrat Khan
 Prince Pervez
 Qutb-ud-din Aibak
 Saleh Kamboh
 Mir Niamat Khan
 Rasul Shahyun
 Zafar Jang Kokaltash

Shrines 

 Bibi Pak Daman
 Ali Hujwiri
 Mian Mir
 Madho Lal Hussain
 Khawaja Tahir Bandgi 
 Ghazi Ilm Din Shaheed 
 Sheikh Musa Ahangar
 Khawaja Mehmud
 Nizam-ud-Din
 Siraj-ud-Din Gilani
 peer makki
 Baba Shah Jamal

Samadhis 
 Bhai Vasti Ram
 Ranjit Singh
 Samadhi of Bhai Mani Singh
 Sir Ganga Ram
 Bhai Taru Singh

Havelis 
There are many havelis inside the Walled City of Lahore, some in good condition while others need urgent attention. Many of these havelis are fine examples of Mughal and Sikh architecture. Some of the havelis inside the Walled City include:
 Chuna Mandi Havelis
 Dina Nath Ki Haveli
 Haveli Barood Khana
 Haveli Mian Khan (Rang Mehal)
 Haveli of Nau Nihal Singh
 Haveli Shergharian (near Lal Khou)
 Haveli Sir Wajid Ali Shah (near Nisar Haveli)
 Lal Haveli beside Mochi Bagh
 Mubarak Begum Haveli Bhatti Gate
 Mubarak Haveli – Chowk Nawab Sahib, Mochi/Akbari Gate
 Mughal Haveli (residence of Maharaja Ranjeet Singh)
 Nisar Haveli
 Salman Sirhindi ki Haveli

Other landmarks 
 Shahi Hammam

Historic neighbourhoods 
 Anarkali
 Badami Bagh
 Baghbanpura
 Begampura
 Mughalpura
 Shahdara Bagh
 Walled City of Lahore

Education 

Lahore is known as Pakistan's educational capital, with more colleges and universities than any other city in Pakistan. The literacy rate of Lahore is 74%. The city is Pakistan's largest producer of professionals in the fields of science, technology, IT, law, engineering, medicine, nuclear sciences, pharmacology, telecommunication, biotechnology, microelectronics, and nanotechnology, and has the only future hyper high-tech center in Pakistan.
Most of the reputable universities are public, but in recent years there has also been an upsurge in the number of private universities. Lahore University of Management Sciences (LUMS) is the only AACSB accredited business school in Pakistan. Lahore hosts some of Pakistan's oldest and best educational institutes, including:

 Aitchison College, established in 1886
 Beaconhouse National University, established in 2003
 Central Model School, established in 1883
 Crescent Model Higher Secondary School, established in 1968
 College of Home Economics, established in 1955
 College of Statistical and Actuarial Sciences, established in 1950
 Convent of Jesus and Mary, established in 1867
 Dayal Singh College, established in 1910
 De'Montmorency College of Dentistry, established in 1929
 Fatima Jinnah Medical University, established in 1948
 Forman Christian College, established in 1864
 Government College University, Lahore, established in 1864
 Hailey College of Commerce, established in 1927
 Islamia College, established in 1892
 Jamia Ashrafia, established in 1947
 King Edward Medical University, established in 1860
 Kinnaird College for Women University, established in 1913
 Lady Maclagan Training College, established in 1933
 Lady Willingdon Nursing School, established in 1933
 Lahore College for Women University, established in 1922
 Lahore Garrison University
 Lahore Grammar School, established in 1979
 Lahore Medical and Dental College, established in 1997
 Lahore School of Economics, established in 1993
 Lahore University of Management Sciences, established in 1986
 M.A.O College, established in 1933
 Muslim Model High School, established in 1890
 National College of Arts, established in 1875
 Oriental College, established in 1876
 Pakistan Institute of Fashion and Design, established in 1994
 PakTurk International Schools and Colleges, established in 2006
 Queen Mary College, established in 1908
 Sacred Heart High School, established in 1906
 Shaikh Khalifa Bin Zayed Al-Nahyan Medical and Dental College, established in 2009
 St. Anthony's High School, established in 1892
 St. Francis High School, established in 1842
 University College Lahore, established in 1994
 University College of Pharmacy, established in 1944
 University Law College, established in 1868
 University of Central Punjab, established in 2002
 University of Education, established in 2002
 University of Engineering and Technology, Lahore, established in 1921
 University of Health Sciences, Lahore, established in 2002
 University of Lahore, established in 1999
 University of Management and Technology (Lahore), established in 2002
 University of the Punjab, established in 1882
 University of Veterinary and Animal Sciences, established in 1882

Notable people

Sports 

Lahore has successfully hosted many international sports events, including the finals of the 1990 Men's Hockey World Cup and the 1996 Cricket World Cup. The headquarters of all major sports governing bodies in Pakistan are located in Lahore, including cricket, hockey, rugby, and football. Lahore is also home to the head office of the Pakistan Olympic Association.

Gaddafi Stadium is a Test cricket ground in Lahore. It was completed in 1959, and renovations were carried out by Pakistani architect Nayyar Ali Dada in the 1990s.

Lahore is home to several golf courses, including the Lahore Gymkhana Golf Course, the Lahore Garrison Golf and Country Club, the Royal Palm Golf Club, and newly built Defence Raya Golf & Country Club. Lake City, a 9-hole course, opened in nearby Raiwind Road in 2011. The newly opened Oasis Golf and Aqua Resort is a state-of-the-art resort, featuring golf, water parks, and leisure activities like horse riding and archery.

The Lahore Marathon is part of an annual package of six international marathons sponsored by Standard Chartered Bank across Asia, Africa, and the Middle East. More than 20,000 athletes from Pakistan and all over the world participate in this event. It was first held on 30 January 2005, and again on 29 January 2006. More than 22,000 people participated in the 2006 race. The third marathon was held on 14 January 2007. Plans exist to build Pakistan's first sports city in Lahore, on the bank of the Ravi River.

Professional sports teams from Lahore

Twin towns and sister cities 

The following international cities have been declared twin towns and sister cities of Lahore.

 Istanbul, Turkey (1975)
 Sariwon, North Korea (1988) 
 Xi'an, Shaanxi, China (1992) 
 Kortrijk, Belgium (1993) 
 Fez, Morocco (1994) 
 Bukhara, Uzbekistan (1995)
 Samarkand, Uzbekistan (1995) 
 Isfahan, Iran (2004) 
 Mashad, Iran (2006) 
 Glasgow, Scotland (2006)
 Chicago, Illinois, United States (2007)
 Belgrade, Serbia (2007) 
 Kraków, Poland (2007)
 Coimbra, Portugal (2007)
 Dushanbe, Tajikistan (2008)
 Córdoba, Spain (2008)
 Bogotá, Colombia (2009)
 Amol, Iran (2010)
 Rio de Janeiro, Brazil (2015)

Awards

In 1966, the Government of Pakistan awarded a special flag, the Hilal-i-istaqlal, to the cities of Lahore, Sargodha, and Sialkot for showing severe resistance to the enemy during the Indo-Pakistani War of 1965, as these cities were targets of the Indian aggression. Every year on Defence Day (6 September), this flag is hoisted in these cities in recognition of the will, courage, and perseverance of their people.

See also
 
 Lahore Fashion Week
 Lahore Knowledge Park
 Lahore Literary Festival
 Lahore Railway Station
 Lahori cuisine
 List of cemeteries in Lahore
 List of cities proper by population
 List of films set in Lahore
 List of hospitals in Lahore
 List of largest cities in Organisation of Islamic Cooperation member countries
 List of metropolitan areas in Asia
 List of people from Lahore
 List of streets in Lahore
 List of tallest buildings in Lahore
 List of towns in Lahore
 List of urban areas by population
Lahori chaddar
 Sikh period in Lahore
 Transport in Lahore
 Walled City of Lahore

Notes

References

Bibliography

External links 

 

Lahore
Cities in Punjab (Pakistan)
Populated places in Lahore District
Capitals of Pakistan
Metropolitan areas of Pakistan
Populated places with period of establishment missing